The 2019 National Football League (also known as the Aminovital National Football League) is the 45th season of the National Football League, it might be the first year that this league will have promotion to the top-flight Singaporean professional league for association football clubs, the Singapore Premier League.

Division 1

Division 2

Top tier

Bottom tier

References

External links
 Football Association of Singapore website

Football competitions in Singapore
Singapore National Football League
1